Hubert Leitgeb (31 October 1965 – 4 February 2012) was an Italian biathlete.

Life and career
Leitgeb participated in two Olympics, in 1992 and 1998. Alongside Johann Passler, Pieralberto Carrara and Andreas Zingerle, he was part of the Italian squad which narrowly missed out on a medal in the men's relay at the 1992 Games, finishing fourth. He won three medals at World Championships, including two golds. He competed in Biathlon World Cup, where he got 131 starts, with 17 finishes in the top 10. In 1994, he won his first and only individual World Cup victory, in a 20 km individual. Leitgeb retired as a biathlete after the 1997–98 season. After his retirement, he worked as a coach for five years. In 2006 he was elected to the International Biathlon Union's Technical Committee. The following year he became race director of the Biathlon World Cup races in Antholz.

Avalanche accident
On 4 February 2012, Leitgeb died in an avalanche accident below the Staller Saddle in the Antholz valley, alongside his brother-in-law. Leitgeb was survived by his wife and two children.

Biathlon results
All results are sourced from the International Biathlon Union.

Olympic Games

World Championships
3 medals (2 gold, 1 bronze)

*During Olympic seasons competitions are only held for those events not included in the Olympic program.
**Pursuit was added as an event in 1997.

Individual victories
1 victory (1 In)

*Results are from UIPMB and IBU races which include the Biathlon World Cup, Biathlon World Championships and the Winter Olympic Games.

Further notable results
 1991: 3rd, Italian championships of biathlon
 1992: 2nd, Italian championships of biathlon
 1993: 2nd, Italian championships of biathlon
 1994: 1st, Italian championships of biathlon
 1996: 3rd, Italian championships of biathlon
 1997:
 1st, Italian championships of biathlon, sprint
 2nd, Italian championships of biathlon
 1998:
 1st, Italian championships of biathlon, sprint
 2nd, Italian championships of biathlon, pursuit
 3rd, Italian championships of biathlon

References

External links
 
 

1965 births
2012 deaths
People from Rasen-Antholz
Germanophone Italian people
Deaths in avalanches
Natural disaster deaths in Italy
Italian male biathletes
Biathletes at the 1992 Winter Olympics
Biathletes at the 1998 Winter Olympics
Olympic biathletes of Italy
Biathlon World Championships medalists
Biathletes of Centro Sportivo Carabinieri
Sportspeople from Südtirol